Impostora (International title: The Impostor / ) is a 2007 Philippine television drama series broadcast by GMA Network. Directed by Maryo J. de los Reyes, it stars Sunshine Dizon and Iza Calzado. The series is loosely based on a 1993 Philippine film Sa Isang Sulok ng mga Pangarap. It premiered on June 4, 2007 on the network's Telebabad line up replacing Super Twins. The series concluded on September 21, 2007 with a total of 80 episodes. It was replaced by Zaido: Pulis Pangkalawakan in its timeslot.

The series is streaming online on YouTube.

Premise
Sara and Lara are conjoined twins when they were young. Their parents agree to have them separated at the age of eight. After their separation, misfortunes occur leaving their mother to put them up for adoption. They will eventually meet again when they get older.

Cast and characters

Lead cast
 Sunshine Dizon as Sara Carreon-Cayetano / Vanessa "Nessa" Carreon-Cayetano
 Iza Calzado as Lara Carreon / Sara Carreon

Supporting cast
 Mark Anthony Fernandez as Nicolas Cayetano
 Alfred Vargas as Carlos Pambide
 Luis Alandy as Leandro Meneses
 Chanda Romero as Anatella Cayetano
 Jean Garcia as Bettina "Betty" Carreon
 Mart Escudero as Santiago "Yago" Cayetano
 Charee Pineda as Trish
 Jennica Garcia as Karen Manansala

Guest cast
 Charice Hermoso as young Sara Carreon
 Charlotte Hermoso as young Lara Carreon
 Zamierre Benevice as young Vanessa Carreon
 Romnick Sarmenta as Henry Carreon
 Gary Estrada as Delfin Carreon
 Gelli de Belen as Adelle Carreon
 Jenny Miller as Fritzie
 Anton Bernardo as Ramil
 Sam Bumatay as Kokay
 EJ Jallorina as Benjo
 Ana Capri as Saling
 Maybeline Dela Cruz as Doray
 Dexter Doria as Dorina
 Ace Espinosa as Tata Oyong
 Flora Gazer as Petra
 Ella Guevara as Kathleen C. Cayetano
 Anna Larrucea as Cora
 Jan Marini as Gemma
 Joanne Quintas as Sofia
 Jacob Rica as Patrick C. Cayetano
 Vaness del Moral as Dindy
 Lem Pelayo as Billy
 Jardson Librando as young Leandro Meneses
 John Regala as Mando
 Ana Roces as Alexis Alvarado
 Vince Saldaña as Tristan
 Shermaine Santiago as Carla
 Deborah Sun as Francisca "Kikay" Manansala
 Robert Villar as Raul
 Chachiee Santos as Tina

Accolades

References

External links
 
 

2007 Philippine television series debuts
2007 Philippine television series endings
Filipino-language television shows
GMA Network drama series
Television shows set in the Philippines